Irene Ojala (born 8 October 1960) is a Norwegian politician of the party Patient Focus in Finnmark.

Education
She is a trained social planner and has a bachelor's degree in High North studies.

Career
She is the leader of the voluntary organization Patient Focus and the foundation Alta Hospital with Patient Focus.

Parliament
In 2021, Ojala won election to the Storting as a representative from Finnmark.

Following the Storting meeting regarding the electricity prices in September 2022, Ojala was denied to hold a speech because her party was considered an electoral list rather than a political party. She called it "undemocratic". The President of the Storting argued that she still could have held her speech had she asked to participate during the three minutes of discussion.

References 

Norwegian politicians

People from Vardø
1960 births
Living people